Nusrat or Nusret or Nasrat is a unisex given name, meaning  "victory" in Arabic. It may refer to:

Men

Nasrat
Hiztullah Yar Nasrat, Afghan detainee in Guantanamo
Nasiruddin Nasrat Shah (died 1532), sultan of Bengal
Nasrat Al Jamal (born 1980), Lebanese footballer
Nasrat Haqparast (born 1995), German professional MMA fighter
Nasrat Khan (born 1926), Afghan detainee in Guantanamo
Nasrat Parsa (1969–2005), Afghan singer
Nasrat Sharqi, Afghan singer
Nasratullah Nasrat (born 1984), Afghan cricketer
Nasrat Khalid (Born 1992), Afghan Entrepreneur

Nusrat
Nusrat al-Din Muhammad (died ca. 1330), Mihrabanid malik of Sistan
Nusrat Fateh Ali Khan (1948–1997), Pakistani musician
Nusrat Hussain, Pakistani pop singer
Nusrat Javed, Pakistani journalist
Nusrat Kasamanli (1946–2003), Azerbaijani poet
Rahat Nusrat Fateh Ali Khan (born 1974), Pakistani musician

Nusret
Nusret Çolpan (1952–2008), Turkish artist
Nusret Fişek (1914–1990), Turkish scholar
Nusret Gökçe (born 1983), Turkish chef (also known as Salt Bae)
Nusret Suman 1905–1978), Turkish sculptor 
Nusret Muslimović, Bosnian football manager

Women
Halide Nusret Zorlutuna (1901–1984), Turkish poet and novelist
Nusrat Bhutto (1929–2011), Pakistani politician, wife of Prime Minister Zulfikar Ali Bhutto and mother of Prime Minister Benazir Bhutto
Nusrat Imroz Tisha (born 1983), Bangladeshi actress, model, and producer
Nusrat Jahan Begum (1865–1952), a wife of Ahmadiyya Community founder Mirza Ghulam Ahmad
Nusrat Jahan (born 1990), Indian actress

Others
Ottoman minelayer Nusret, Ottoman and later Turkish minelayer that played a role in World War I
Nusrat Bhutto Colony, a neighbourhood in Karachi
Nusrat Jehan Academy (main campus), an education complex in Pakistan
Operation Nasrat, an operation by Afghan insurgents in 2007

Arabic masculine given names
Turkish masculine given names